Actias ignescens is a moth in the family Saturniidae. It is found in Laos and India, where it has been recorded from the Andaman Islands.

References

Ignescens
Moths described in 1877
Moths of Asia